"No Substitute Love" is the third single from British hip-hop artist Estelle's second album Shine. The song is an improvised cover of both Reggae performer Half Pint's "Substitute Lover" and George Michael's "Faith". The song is her second international single in Europe.

Music video
The music video was released to TV music channels in the UK on 30 May. It features a cameo from Kelly Rowland, America's Next Top Model Cycle 2 contestant Sara Racey-Tabrizi, Kardinal Offishall, Amanda Diva, and Project Runway Season 4 winner Christian Siriano.  The video was directed by Jake McAfee.

Track listings and formats
UK CD 1
 "No Substitute Love"

UK CD 2
 "No Substitute Love"
 "Magnificent"
 "No Substitute Love (Wideboys Miami mix radio edit)
 "No Substitute Love" (video)

Australian CD single
 "No Substitute Love"
 "No Substitute Love" (Wideboys Miama Mix)
 "No Substitute Love" (Treasure Fingers Mix)

Chart

References

Estelle (musician) songs
2008 singles
Songs written by George Michael
Songs written by Wyclef Jean
Songs written by Estelle (musician)
Songs written by John Legend
2008 songs